Union of Progressive Forces can refer to:

 Union des forces progressistes (Canada)
 Union of the Forces of Progress